Podalia guaya is a moth of the Megalopygidae family. It was described by William Schaus in 1927. It is found in Paraguay.

References

Moths described in 1927
Megalopygidae